Miri-Piri (Gurmukhi: ਮੀਰੀ-ਪੀਰੀ; mīrī pīrī) is a concept that has been practiced in Sikh religion since seventeenth century. The concept of "The Mir and the Pir" (temporal power and spiritual authority) was started by the sixth Guru of Sikhism, Guru Hargobind, on June 12, 1606. After the martyrdom of his father, Guru Hargobind ascended to the Guruship and fulfilled the prophecy that was given by primal figure of Sikh Baba Buddha that the guru will possess spiritual and temporal power. Guru Hargobind introduced the two swords of Miri and Piri symbolizing both worldly (political) and spiritual authority. The two kirpan of Miri and Piri are tied together with a khanda in center, so the combination of both is considered supreme,  Where action informed or arising out of the spiritual heart completes one’s purpose and meaning in the world of action: spirituality.

See also 

 Sant Sipahi

References

Sikh practices